Angola has competed at the IAAF World Athletics Championships on fourteen occasions, and did not send a delegation for the 2009 and 2017 editions. Its competing country code is ANG. The country has not won any medals at the competition and as of 2017 no Angolan athlete has reached the top eight of an event. Its best performance is by João N'Tyamba, who placed thirteenth in the 1999 men's 10,000 metres final.

2019
Angola will compete at the 2019 World Championships in Athletics in Doha, Qatar, from 27 September to 6 October 2019. Angola will be represented by 1 athlete.

References 

 
Angola
World Championships in Athletics